The 2009 FIBA Asia Championship for Women is the qualifying tournament for FIBA Asia at the World Championship 2010 at Czech Republic. The tournament will be held on Chennai, India from 17 to 24 September.

The championship is divided into two levels: Level I and Level II. The two lowest finishers of Level I meets the top two finishers to determine which teams qualify for Level for 2011's championship. The losers are relegated to Level II.

Participating teams

Preliminary round

Level I

Level II

Qualifying round
Winners are promoted to Level I for the 2011 championships.

Final round

Semifinals

3rd place

Final

Final standing

Awards

Most Valuable Player:  Bian Lan

References

External links
FIBA Asia official website
FIBA Asia Championship 2009 official website

2009
2009 in women's basketball
women
B
Bask